Ainārs Kovals (born 21 November 1981) is a Latvian track and field athlete who competes in the javelin throw. His personal best throw is 86.64 m. He achieved this at the 2008 Summer Olympics, where he finished second.

He has been coached by Valentīna Eiduka. He is married to fellow javelin thrower Sinta Ozoliņa-Kovala.

International competitions

Seasonal bests by year
2002 - 75.05
2003 - 80.75
2004 - 82.13
2005 - 82.22
2006 - 85.95
2007 - 82.23
2008 - 86.64
2009 - 82.47
2010 - 82.33
2011 - 78.39
2012 - 83.89
2013 - 80.71
2014 - 81.75
2015 - 78.90

References

External links
 
 
 

1981 births
Living people
Athletes from Riga
Latvian male javelin throwers
Olympic athletes of Latvia
Olympic silver medalists for Latvia
Athletes (track and field) at the 2008 Summer Olympics
Athletes (track and field) at the 2012 Summer Olympics
Medalists at the 2008 Summer Olympics
World Athletics Championships athletes for Latvia
Olympic silver medalists in athletics (track and field)
Universiade medalists in athletics (track and field)
Universiade gold medalists for Latvia
Universiade bronze medalists for Latvia
Medalists at the 2005 Summer Universiade
Medalists at the 2007 Summer Universiade
Medalists at the 2009 Summer Universiade